Seealpsee is a lake in the Alpstein range of the canton of Appenzell Innerrhoden, Switzerland. The lake can be reached by foot from Wasserauen or from Ebenalp. It is a popular tourist destination. A network of routes around Ebenalp connects Seealpsee with other notable sights in the Appenzell Alps, such as the Wildkirchli and Säntis.

The Berggasthaus Forelle am Seealpsee, with a large open air terrace, dominates the western end of the lake.

See also
List of mountain lakes of Switzerland

External links
 Berggasthaus Forelle am Seealpsee 

Lakes of Switzerland
Lakes of Appenzell Innerrhoden
Tourist attractions in Appenzell Innerrhoden
Appenzell Alps
LSeealpsee